Ivo is a masculine given name, in use in various European languages. The name used in western European languages  originates as a Normannic name recorded since the High Middle Ages, and the French name Yves is a variant of it. The unrelated South Slavic name is a variant of the name Ivan (John).

Origins
The name is recorded from the High Middle Ages among the Normans of France and England (Yvo of Chartres, born c. 1040). The name's etymology may be either Germanic or Celtic, in either case deriving from a given name with a first element meaning "yew" (Gaulish Ivo-, Germanic Iwa-). The name may have been spread by the cult of Saint Ivo (d. 1303), patron saint of Brittany.
 
The Slavic name is a hypocorism, like its variant Ivica.

Variations
Ivo has the genitive form of "Ives" in the place name St Ives.  In France, the usual variation of the name is Yves. In the Hispanic countries of Latin America, the name is commonly spelled Evo but Ivo is still the more common spelling.

Feminine equivalents of the name include Iva, Eva, and Yvette, amongst others.

People

Medieval

Saint Ivo of Chartres (1040s–1115), French bishop and confessor
Saint Ivo of Kermartin (1253–1303), Breton advocate for the poor
Saint Ivo of Ramsey, Cornish bishop
Ivo Taillebois (died 1094), Huscarl of William the Conqueror
Ivo de Grandmesnil (died 1102), English crusader
Ivo de Vesci, 11th Century Norman noble, Lord of Alnwick
Ivo (Dean of Wells), the inaugural Dean of Wells between 1140 and 1164

Modern
Ivo Andrić (1892–1975), Serbo-Croatian writer and Nobel prize winner
Ivo Andrić-Lužanski (born 1956), Croat politician of Bosnia and Herzegovina
Ivo Basay (born 1966), Chilean footballer
Ivo Belet (born 1959), Belgian politician
Ivo Bligh, 8th Earl of Darnley (1859–1927), English cricketer
Ivo Caprino (1920–2001), Norwegian filmmaker
Ivo Daalder (born 1960), American diplomat
Ivo Daneu (born 1937), Slovenian  basketball player and coach
Ivo Eensalu (born 1949), Estonian actor and theatre director
Ivo Fabijan (1950–2006), Croatian musician, singer, composer and producer
Ivo Garrani (1924–2015), Italian actor
Ivo Goldstein (born 1958), Croatian historian
Ivo Graham (born 1990), British comedian
Ivo Gregurević (1952–2019), Croatian actor
Ivo Iličević (born 1986), Croatian footballer
Ivo Josipović (born 1957), Croatian politician and President of Croatia from 2010 to 2015
Ivo Karlović (born 1979), Croatian tennis player
Ivo Kuusk (born 1937), Estonian opera singer 
Ivo Linna (born 1949), Estonian singer
Ivo Livi (1921–1991), Italian-born French actor and singer
Ivo Lola Ribar (1916–1943), Croatian politician and military leader
Ivo Lorscheiter (1927–2007), Brazilian bishop
Ivo Malec (1925–2019), Croatian composer and conductor
Ivo Michiels (1923–2012), Belgian writer
Ivo Minář (born 1984), Czech tennis player
Ivo Niehe (born 1946), Dutch television presenter and producer
Ivo Opstelten (born 1944), Dutch politician
Ivo Papazov (born 1952), Bulgarian clarinetist
Ivo Indzhev (born 1955), Bulgarian journalist and writer
Ivo Pauwels (born 1950), Flemish author
Ivo Perilli (1902–1994), Italian screenwriter
Ivo Peters (1915–1989), British photographer
Ivo Petrić (1931–2018), Slovenian composer
Ivo Pinto (born 1990), Portuguese footballer
Ivo Pitanguy (1926–2016), Brazilian plastic surgeon
Ivo Pogorelić (born 1958), Croatian pianist
Ivo Ringe (born 1951), German painter
Ivo Robić (1923–2000), Croatian singer and songwriter
Ivo Rodrigues (footballer) (born 1995), Portuguese footballer
Ivo Rodrigues (runner) (born 1960), Brazilian marathon runner
Ivo Ron (born 1967), Ecuadorian footballer
Ivo Samkalden (1912–1995), Dutch politician
Ivo Sanader (born 1953), Croatian politician
Ivo Snijders (born 1980), Dutch rower
Ivo Stourton (born 1982), English author 
Ivo Strejček (born 1962), Czech politician
Ivo Tijardović (1895–1976), Croatian composer
Ivo Trumbić (born 1935), Croatian water polo player and coach
Ivo Ulich (born 1974), Czech footballer
Ivo Uukkivi (born 1965), Estonian actor
Ivo Vajgl (born 1943), Slovenian politician
Ivo Van Damme (1954–1976), Belgian athlete
Ivo van Hove (born 1958), Belgian theatre director
Ivo Viktor (born 1942), Czech football goalkeeper
Ivo Vojnović (1857–1929), Croatian and Serbian writer
Ivo Watts-Russell (born 1954), English musician and producer, founder of 4AD record label
Ivo Widlak (born 1978), Polish journalist

Characters
Dr. Ivo Robotnik, also known by the alias Dr. Eggman, the main antagonist of the Sonic the Hedgehog video game series
Professor Ivo, a villainous scientist in DC Comics and opponent of the Justice League of America
Ivo Shandor, the eccentric designer of the building where the Ghostbusters confront Gozer and its minions
Ivo Salvini, main character in Federico Fellini's last film The Voice of the Moon, played by Roberto Benigni
Ivo Sharktooth, Private Jäger in Phil and Kaja Foglio's gaslamp fantasy webcomic, Girl Genius
Ivo Andonov, an antagonist in the Pod Prikritie series

See also 

 Ive (given name)
 Iven (given name)

References 

Masculine given names
Bulgarian masculine given names
Croatian masculine given names
Czech masculine given names
Dutch masculine given names
Estonian masculine given names
French masculine given names
Given names derived from plants or flowers
Italian masculine given names